Jacco Eltingh and Paul Haarhuis were the defending champions and successfully defended their title after David Adams and Andrei Olhovskiy withdrew prior to the final.

Seeds

Draw

Draw

External links
Draw

Kremlin Cup
Kremlin Cup